Petar Jokić may refer to:

 Petar Jokić (footballer) (born 1985), Serbian football goalkeeper
 Petar Jokić (basketball) (born 1991), Serbian basketball player